= Den König segne Gott =

English: God bless our King
- Flag of Saxony
- Unofficial anthem of Saxony
- Lyrics: Georg Karl Alexander von Richter, early 19th century
- Music: Unknown, uses the tune from God Save the Queen

Den König segne Gott (lit: God bless the King) was, though not officially declared the national anthem, historically assumed the anthem of Saxony.

== History ==
The lyrics were written by Georg Karl Alexander von Richter and were sung for the first time on June 5, 1815. It was published as a soldier's song in 1883 by a bookseller, Ernst Röthke in Berlin. The lyrics were very similar to the British original.

== Lyrics ==
Den König segne Gott
Verse number	German lyrics
1.	Den König segne Gott, Den er zum Heil uns gab, Ihn segne Gott. Ihn schmücke Ruhm und Ehr, ihn flieh der Schmeichler Heer, Weisheit steh´um ihn her, Ihn segne Gott!
2.	Gib ihm lang Regiment, Dem Land Fried‘ und Ruh´, Den Waffen Sieg. Er ist gerecht und gut In allem, was er tut, Schont jedes Sachsen Blut, Ihn segne Gott!
